The James Buchanan House is a historic log house in Nashville, Tennessee. It was built circa 1800 by James Buchanan, an early Nashville pioneer and signer of the 1789 Cumberland Compact. It's one of the earliest log homes still in existence in the area and is open to the public. The logs were hewn from Tennessee red cedars and nearly-extinct American chestnut trees. The floors were formed from Tennessee poplars and rest on a Tennessee limestone foundation. It has been listed on the National Register of Historic Places since March 29, 1984.

References

Houses on the National Register of Historic Places in Tennessee
Houses completed in 1800
Houses in Nashville, Tennessee
National Register of Historic Places in Nashville, Tennessee